Ville Akseli Juurikkala (born 6 March 1980) is a Finnish photographer and music video director. He is best known as a "rock photographer", having had a long working relationship with bands such as HIM, Nightwish and Apocalyptica. Other notable figures Juurikkala has worked with include Mika Häkkinen, Andrea Bocelli and Ban Ki-moon. He has also illustrated several books.

During his career, Ville Juurikkala has been awarded several times. He is also the first Finnish photographer to have his work featured at the prestigious Morrison Hotel Gallery.

Early life
Ville Akseli Juurikkala was born 6 March 1980 in Lohja, Finland. His mother is film director Kaija Juurikkala, while his father Matti Tukiainen worked for the Central Organisation of Finnish Trade Unions. Juurikkala also has a younger brother Oskari Juurikkala, who is a priest and a member of the Opus Dei movement.

After his parents' divorce, Juurikkala moved to Vantaa with his mother and brother. At age ten, Juurikkala took up keyboards, but switched to guitar six months later having been inspired by Guns N' Roses and Metallica. As a teenager, Juurikkala played in several different bands. He also worked as a lighting technician on several films and television productions. He also acted in his mother's films Rosa Was Here and Taking Moses for a Ride. Juurikkala was interested in a career in film, but was encouraged to first familiarize himself with photography. At age sixteen, Juurikkala took up photography and began to like it more than film.

After gymnasium, Juurikkala applied to the University of Art and Design Helsinki, but was rejected.

Career

Photography 
Juurikkala initially worked as a commercial and portrait photographer, until he was hired as a freelancer by City magazine. Through City, he got his first chance to illustrate a book, when Helsinki restaurant Papà Giovanni needed a photographer for their cook book. During the early 2000s, Juurikkala also worked for the magazines Suosikki, Soundi and Katso. This introduced him to several different bands and artists.

Juurikkala shot his first album cover for Darude's second record Rush. In 2005, he was asked to join The 69 Eyes on tour as their photographer. This resulted in a book titled Route 69 – a Photographic Journey with The 69 Eyes, which was published in 2006. Juurikkala soon found work with other bands and artists as well, including HIM and Hanoi Rocks. Nightwish and Apocalyptica have also released photography books shot by Juurikkala. In 2007, he was named City's Best Rock Photographer by City magazine. He also won the Kultajyvä–prize and was awarded at the Vuoden huiput ceremony the same year.

In 2008, Good Charlotte's lead singer Joel Madden asked Juurikkala to join the band on tour as their photographer. The collaboration soon led to Juurikkala moving to Los Angeles, where he worked with Kat Von D and Chester Bennington among others. He also shot the cover for Slash's album Live in Manchester, which was released in 2010. Other prominent figures Juurikkala has since worked with include Secretary-General of the United Nations Ban Ki-moon, Formula One World Champion Mika Häkkinen and opera singer Andrea Bocelli.

In 2015, Juurikkala's work was on display at the It’s Only Rock’n Roll exhibition, which was held at the Tiketti Galleria in Helsinki. Some of the pieces were later included in the Sinä & Minä portrait exhibition at the Vantaa Art Museum Artsi. In 2017, the Helsinki Art Museum held an exhibition titled HIM: Right Here In My Eyes, which featured Juurikkala's newly shot photographs of HIM preparing for their farewell tour. The exhibition was later also held at the prestigious Morrison Hotel Gallery in New York, which specializes in rock photography. Juurikkala is the first Finnish photographer to be featured by the Gallery.

Juurikkala has also worked as a still photographer on films, such as Keisarikunta, Ganes and Imaginaerum. He also works as portrait and nature photographer. In 2019, Juurikka illustrated the book Metsässä – Uppoudu metsään, itseesi ja elämään by Jarko Taivasmaa. An exhibition of the same name was held at the Espoo Culture Center in September of that year. Juurikkala's work with The 69 Eyes was also on display at Finland's Motorcycle Museum in September.

Directing 
Juurikkala directed his first music video in 2007 for the song ”Black Ice” by Hanna Pakarinen. In 2012, he was asked to direct the music video for The Voice of Finland finalist Jesse Kaikuranta's song ”Vie mut kotiin”. Since then Juurikkala has directed several music videos for various Finnish bands and artists. Michael Monroe, Santa Cruz and Jonne Aaron are among his most frequent collaborators. Juurikkala's video for Michael Monroe's ”Ballad of the Lower East Side” won the audience poll at the 2013 Oulu Music Video Festival. The music video for Lauri Tähkä's ”Mä en pelkää” was nominated for Music Video of the Year at the 2018 Emma Gala. Juurikkala has also directed videos for Bullet for My Valentine and Amaranthe.

In 2011, Juurikkala and Jan-Olof Svarvar directed the documentary Lakeuksilta Hollywoodiin, which is based on musician and producer Jimmy Westerlund.

Style and influences 
Among Ville Juuriikkala's biggest influences are Bob Gruen and Anton Corbijn. His visual style has its roots in cross processing, a popular technique during the 1990s. When Juurikkala began working as a professional photographer, cross processing was not as widely used anymore. Still Juurikkala has stayed true to his visual style, stating: ”This is what I want to do. It's not trendy, doesn't bother me.” For Juurikkala the most essential part of his work is ”getting close to the person, and then getting that presence across to other people.” In regards to his shooting style, Juurikkala has stated: ”My tonal palette is quite rock in its starkness, but I also strive for a certain painting-like-look with my colors. Maybe it's because I can't paint. The compositions and poses aren't very rock most of the time. Maybe it's this slight dichotomy that brings something extra to my shots.”

Personal life 

From 2008 to 2011, Juurikkala lived in Los Angeles. In 2010, he began to feel burnt out, and announced that he'd be going on a two-month trip to the Santiago de Compostela pilgrimage from France to Spain. During his journey, all of Juurikkala's possessions were stolen, so he slept in the woods and with the homeless. Despite this, Juurikkala stated: ”I had never been so happy. I realized that success and material possessions didn't bring deep joy. For most of us, success and material possessions breathe expectation and fear. Having lost everything, there was nothing left to lose. Nothing to fear, nothing to expect. In its place was this moment. A deep joy of just being – here and now.” Eventually Juurikkala's mother flew him back to Finland. At the same time he decided to quit drinking, and in 2012 he moved back to Finland.

In August 2006, an inebriated Juurikkala married a Las Vegas stripper. The marriage was later dissolved.

In 2012, Juurikkala met his future wife Noora, who is an interior designer. They have three children together: Valtteri, Lilja and Maija. The Juurikkalas lived in Lohja from 2016 to 2019. Before that, they lived in Kirkkonummi, and later in Los Angeles. In 2019, they moved to Lahti, and from there to Porvoo. Ville and Noora Juurikkala separated in late 2019.

Bibliography

Filmography

Documentaries 
 Lakeuksilta Hollywoodiin (2011)

Music videos

Awards and nominations

References

External links

 

Finnish music video directors
Finnish photographers
1980 births
Living people
Finnish expatriates in the United States